D. S. Veeraiah is an Indian politician from the Bharatiya Janata Party, Karnataka who was the Member of Legislative Council from 2006 to 2018. He had contested the 2009 Indian general election from Kolar and lost to K. H. Muniyappa of the Congress by a margin of 23,006 votes.

References 

1946 births

Living people
Bharatiya Janata Party politicians from Karnataka